Ghoda (meaning: Horse) is a 2023 Indian Marathi-language film directed by T Mahesh. Its screenplay is by Maheshkumar Munjale and its story is by Jameer Attar. It is produced by T Mahesh Film Production, Anil Vanave in collaboration with Umeshchandra Shinde and Nayan Chitte. It was theatrically released on 17 February 2023.

Plot 
A construction worker's son sees a horse brought for a boy living next door and demands a similar horse. But, even though the financial situation is bad, the father tries to fulfill his son's wish.

Cast 

 Kailash Waghmare 
 Archana Mahadeo
 Rahul Belapurkar
 Vajra Pawar 
 Dilip Dhanawade 
 Rahul Belapurkar
 Shivraj Nale
 Devendra Dev
 Prafulla Kamble

Soundtrack

Release

Theatrical 
The film was theatrically released on 17 February 2023.

Reception

References

External links 

 

2023 films
2020s Marathi-language films
Indian fantasy films